Garlin is a surname. Notable people with the surname include:

Anna Garlin Spencer (1851–1931), American educator, feminist, and Unitarian minister
Bunji Garlin, reggae soca artist from Trinidad and Tobago
Jeff Garlin, actor and comedian
Sender Garlin, American Communist writer
Tammie Garlin, the victim in the Garlin case